Russian Spring may refer to:

 2014 pro-Russian unrest in Ukraine, known as the "Russian Spring"
 The "first Russian spring" of the 1950s during the leadership of Nikita Khrushchev in Russia
 Russian Spring, a 1991 novel by Norman Spinrad
 Russian Spring, a musical project by Pete Namlook
 "Russian Spring", a 1905 poem by Ivan Bunin

See also
 Spring (political terminology)
 Russian Spring Punch, an IBA Official Cocktail